Demario Antonio (born December 20, 1991) is a Mexican-Jamaican actor.

TV

Sons Of Anarchy (TV series) (2008- Present) - Andre
Gang Related (2013) - Raq
Anger Management (2013) - Marcus
Stevie TV (2013) - Demario
NCIS (2013) - Hugo
Lets Stay Together (2013) - Sam
Deadwood( 2013)  - Salvador
The Walking Dead (2013) - Juan
Breaking Bad (2013) - Luis Mario Arismendi
The Game (2012) - Demario
Cold Case (2012) - Arron
Boston Legal (2009) - Santiago
The Shield (2009) - Jermaine
Crime Scene Investigation (2008) - Luis "Nacho"

Films

 Fast & Furious 6 (2013) - Carmen
 Iron Man 3 (2013) 
 Black November (2013) - Dominic
 The Avengers (2012) - SN
 Bad Karma  (2012) - Juju
 Escape (2012) - Kevin
 Resident Evil: Afterlife (2010) - Carlos
 Today You Die (2005) - Prisoner
 Beauty Shop (2005) - Demario
 Shackles (2005) - Kevin

External links
 https://www.imdb.com/name/nm4983691/
 http://demarioantoniotheactor.tumblr.com/

1991 births
Living people